The 2022–23 Texas Southern Tigers basketball team represented Texas Southern University in the 2022–23 NCAA Division I men's basketball season. The Tigers, led by fifth-year head coach Johnny Jones, played their home games at the Health and Physical Education Arena in Houston, Texas, as members of the Southwestern Athletic Conference.

With a record of 14–20, Texas Southern entered the NCAA Tournament with one of the worst regular season records ever, with a winning percentage of 41.18%. It also had the most losses by an automatic bid in the history of the tournament.

Previous season
The Tigers finished the 2021–22 season 19–13, 13–5 in SWAC play to finish in second place. As the No. 2 seed, they defeated No. 7 seed Jackson State, Grambling State and top-seeded Alcorn State to win the SWAC tournament and receive the conference's automatic bid into the NCAA tournament. They were given the No. 16 seed in the Midwest Region, where they would defeat Texas A&M–Corpus Christi in the First Four, before falling to top-seeded and eventual national champion Kansas in the First Round.

Roster

Schedule and results

|-
!colspan=9 style=| Non-conference regular season

|-
!colspan=9 style=| SWAC regular season

|-
!colspan=9 style=| SWAC tournament

|-
!colspan=12 style=|NCAA tournament

Sources

References

Texas Southern Tigers basketball seasons
Texas Southern
Texas Southern Tigers basketball
Texas Southern Tigers basketball
Texas Southern